Hans Hermann Herz (September 23, 1908 – December 26, 2005) was an American scholar of international relations and law. He coined the concept of the security dilemma.

Early life
He was born in Düsseldorf, Germany to Carl and Elizabeth Aschaffenburg Herz. In 1935, he fled Germany because he was Jewish and emigrated to Switzerland where he received a diploma from the Graduate Institute of International Studies in Geneva in 1938. In 1938, he emigrated to the United States.

Academic career 
In the United States, he found a temporary position at Princeton University through the assistance of Abraham Flexner. In 1940, he also worked at Trinity  College (Connecticut). In 1941 Ralph Bunche, who headed the Political Science department at Howard University, hired Herz. After World War II he worked as a political analyst for the US State Department - he took part in the US delegation to the Nuremberg trials and also helped draw up a plan for democratizing the occupation zone in Germany.

In 1942, Herz wrote that "Power competition among several units of a system eventually leads either to the predominance of one of them or to the establishment of a system where the political units balance each other, and thus can continue to exist side by side." Herz wrote that a "world government" was not utopian, but that the shift from a system of nation-states to one of world government would require "an ideological and spiritual revolution."

In a 1950 article, Herz coined the concept of the security dilemma. While at Harvard, Herz wrote Political Realism and Political Idealism, a book which the American Political Science Association awarded the Woodrow Wilson Prize in 1951. In the book, Herz criticizes "political idealism" for failing to grapple with the security dilemma. he crafts a theory of "Realist Liberalism." According to a 1952 review of the book, Herz's "approach to the problem of politics is... essentially psychological in character. Man, he thinks, is driven in his relations with other men by two contradictory impulses. Through fear of others he is impelled to seek security in a competitive struggle for power; through compassion for his fellow men, he regrets the sufferings thus entailed, and yearns for universal peace."

The following year, he joined City College of New York, where he taught International Relations until his retirement in 1979. Herz was one of a number of Jewish refugees from Nazi Germany who found positions in American universities and taught International Relations from a critical, Realist perspective. He wrote books and several influential articles.

He died in Scarsdale, New York on December 26, 2005, at the age of 97.

Personal life
Herz married Anne Klein (d. 2003) in 1941. They had a son, Stephen, in 1946.

See also
Security dilemma, term coined by John Herz

References

Joe Holley, John H. Herz, 97; Howard U. Scholar, Washington Post Staff Writer, January 25, 2006
John Herz - the following are excerpts from an address given at the Commemorative-Celebration Honoring John H. Herz The Graduate Center of the City University of New York March 15, 2006

1908 births
2005 deaths
Graduate Institute of International and Development Studies alumni
American legal scholars
American political scientists
International relations scholars
Recipients of the Order of Merit of the Federal Republic of Germany
German emigrants to the United States
20th-century political scientists